The Walls of Tallinn are the medieval defensive walls constructed around the city of Tallinn in Estonia.

History
The first wall around Tallinn was ordered to be constructed by Margaret Sambiria in 1265 resulting in its name, the 'Margaret Wall.' Since that time it has been enlarged and strengthened. The walls and the many gates are still largely  extant today. This is one of the reasons that Tallinn's old town became a World Heritage Site. The walls were enlarged in the fourteenth century, and citizens of Tallinn were required to turn out for guard duty, which meant to wear their armour and demonstrate their readiness to face invaders.

Objects in the city wall

Notes

Buildings and structures in Tallinn
Tallinn
1265 establishments in Europe
History of Tallinn
Lists of buildings and structures in Estonia
Tallinn-related lists
Buildings and structures completed in the 13th century
Gothic architecture in Estonia
Tourist attractions in Tallinn
Tallinn Old Town